The First Urkullu Government (the Basque Government of the 10th legislature) was the regional government of the Basque Country led by President (Lehendakari) Iñigo Urkullu between 14 December 2012 and 25 November 2016. It was formed in November 2016 after the regional election.

The Basque Parliament elected Iñigo Urkullu as President for the first time, with the support of the EAJ-PNV. The PNV formed a government that divided its functions into eight departments, each with one minister.

History

On December 29, 2014, the Basque Government and the Generalitat agreed to oppose the "decentralization" measures in Madrid, using different strategies but respecting each other.

On 31 December 2015, Iñigo Urkullu stated that there would be an opportunity to "grow and create jobs" and that the Basque Country had a "right moment" because the foundations were "stronger".

Government

References 

2012 establishments in the Basque Country (autonomous community)
Cabinets established in 2012
Cabinets of the Basque Country (autonomous community)